Kurt Niedermayer (born 25 November 1955 in Reilingen) is a German former footballer, now a coach. Niedermayer, who played in defence or midfield, played for Karlsruher SC, FC Bayern Munich, VfB Stuttgart, FC Locarno and SC Pfullendorf. He won one cap for West Germany in 1980. He managed SV Wacker Burghausen from 1992 until 2000 and was later a youth coach at Bayern Munich.

Honours 
 Bundesliga: 1979–80, 1980–81, 1983–84
 DFB-Pokal: 1981–82

References

External links 
 

1955 births
Living people
People from Rhein-Neckar-Kreis
Sportspeople from Karlsruhe (region)
German footballers
Germany international footballers
Germany B international footballers
Germany youth international footballers
Association football defenders
Bundesliga players
2. Bundesliga players
Karlsruher SC players
FC Bayern Munich footballers
VfB Stuttgart players
FC Locarno players
German football managers
FC Bayern Munich non-playing staff
SC Pfullendorf players
Footballers from Baden-Württemberg
West German footballers
West German expatriate footballers
West German expatriate sportspeople in Switzerland